The Bombay Beach Biennale is an annual art festival held in Bombay Beach, California on the Salton Sea in the lowest community in the United States. It was co-founded by Tao Ruspoli, Stefan Ashkenazy, and Lily Johnson White in 2016. The festival features both temporary pieces and permanent installations such as the Hermitage Museum (designed by Greg Haberny), Bombay Beach Opera House (designed by James Ostrer), and a drive-in theater.

Themes
In 2016, the theme was "Decay".

In 2017, the theme was "The Way the Future Used to Be".

In 2018, the theme was "God’s Silence".

In 2019, the topic was “Post-Modernism”.

In 2020, activities were postponed due to COVID 19.

In 2021, the Biennale’s theme was “More Minimalism”, and the event was expanded into an entire season rather than a single weekend, with artists encouraged to live within the community full time for part of the year.

In 2022, the theme of the Biennale Season will be “Questioning Hierarchy”.

References

Art festivals in the United States